Han Wenxiu (born September 1963) is a Chinese economist and politician, currently serving as executive deputy director of the .

He is a representative of the 20th National Congress of the Chinese Communist Party and a member of the 20th Central Committee of the Chinese Communist Party.

Biography
Han was born in Zanhuang County, Hebei, in September 1963. In 1980, he enrolled at Peking University where he received his bachelor's degree in 1984 and his master's degree in 1989 both in economics. He also received his  doctor's degree in finance in 2010 from the Renmin University of China. He studied at Oxford University between September 1992 and September 1993.

Han worked at the Economic Research Center of the State Planning Commission (now Macroeconomic Research Institute of National Development and Reform Commission) from January 1989 to July 1997. He then worked in other departments of the National Development and Reform Commission till 2005.

In December, he was promoted again to become executive deputy director, a position at ministerial level.

Publications

References

1963 births
Living people
People from Zanhuang County
Peking University alumni
Renmin University of China alumni
Alumni of the University of Oxford
People's Republic of China politicians from Hebei
Chinese Communist Party politicians from Hebei
Members of the 20th Central Committee of the Chinese Communist Party
Chinese economists